Dorena is an unincorporated community in Lane County, Oregon, United States.  It is located southeast of Cottage Grove on the Row River, a tributary of the Coast Fork Willamette River.

History
The first settlers arrived in the Dorena area in the 1850s and depended on agriculture to survive, but later logging and gold mining became the mainstays of the local economy. Dorena was named by combining the first names of Dora Burnette and Lorena Martin. Dorena school was built in 1896, and Dorena post office was established in 1899. In 1946, the town was abandoned when the Corps of Engineers began construction of Dorena Dam on the Row River for flood control. The dam was completed in 1949 and created Dorena Reservoir, which flooded the townsite. The community was moved five miles upriver.

Climate
This region experiences warm (but not hot) and dry summers, with no average monthly temperatures above .  According to the Köppen Climate Classification system, Dorena has a warm-summer Mediterranean climate, abbreviated "Csb" on climate maps.

Transportation
The Row River Trail, a rails to trails conversion of a former Oregon, Pacific and Eastern Railway line, passes through Dorena.

References

External links
Historic images of the Dorena area from Salem Public Library
1911 image of students inside Dorena School from University of Oregon Library

Unincorporated communities in Lane County, Oregon
1899 establishments in Oregon
Populated places established in 1899
Unincorporated communities in Oregon